BCN Visuals is an anamorphic 3D technology company founded in Barcelona, Spain and now headquartered in New York, United States. The company provides 3D anamorphic content for out-of-home billboard advertising.

History 
BCN Visuals was established in 2017 by Eric Sas and Alan Company in Barcelona, Spain. The Walking Dead's debut on Disney+ in Europe was BCN Visuals' first really ground-breaking campaign.

In 2018, the company partnered with BMW to create a series of animated advertisements that were displayed on a Times Square billboard in New York City. The advertisements featured a 3D roadway that appeared to come to life on the billboard, showcasing BMW's latest models in a dynamic and engaging way. 

In 2020, BCN Visuals partnered with Callao City Lights to introduce 3D technology to digital out-of-home advertising in Spain. The collaboration resulted in a 3D digital billboard located in the heart of Madrid that showcased advanced 3D animations and visuals for brands.

BCN Visuals' had a partnership with Football Club Barcelona to release the football club's first-ever NFT. The NFT features a 3D model of the Camp Nou stadium, home to FC Barcelona, and was released on the blockchain marketplace OpenSea. In the same year BCN Visuals also collaborated with DPAA.

Awards 
In July 2021 BCN Visuals awarded a Promax Award for Best Out-of-Home Ad in Europe with Walt Disney for The Walking Dead Ad. and in 2022, it was awarded the Clio Award for Best Out-of-Home Ad with Netflix, The Witcher.

References 

Companies based in Barcelona
2017 establishments in Spain